The Muruwari, also spelt Murawari, Murawarri, Murrawarri and other variants, are an Aboriginal Australian people of the state of New South Wales and the southwestern area of Queensland.

Language
A monograph on and a dictionary of Muruwari have been published by Lynette Oates.

Country
The Muruwari lands stretch over some  around Barringun, on the Queensland - New South Wales border, extending north as far as Mulga Downs and Weela in the former state. It includes Enngonia on the Warrego River; Brenda, and Weilmoringle on the Culgoa River, as well as Milroy, and south as far as the vicinity of Collerina.

History of contact
The explorer Thomas Mitchell, during his expedition to find a route to the Gulf of Carpentaria, surveyed the area of the Culgoa and Balonne Rivers in 1846, relying on a Wiradjuri guide and interpreter Yuranigh.  At the same time, In 1845 his son Roderick Mitchell, who was Commissioner of Crown Lands, on hearing stockmen's reports of rich pasturage in the area, began mapping it. By 1850 regulations allowed settlers to take up  of land on 14 year leases. Conflicts arose over land use, and several massacres and killings took place in the following years.

Many Muruwari attached themselves to established stations, working there except for specific periods when ritual duties or "going bush" led them to take leave: newspaper reports at the time single out Thomas Caddell's Tatala run, managed by Frederick Wherritt, as a station where relations were conducted "with tact and humanity". Wherritt's approach paid off: several hundred sheep were saved in the 1861 flood when the local blacks rescued them by herding them up to the one piece of high dry ground in the area.

Alternative names
 Murawari, Murawarri, Murrawarri, Muruworri, Muruwurri
 Murueri
 Moorawarree, Moorawarrie
 Marawari

See also
 Murrawarri Republic

Notes

Citations

Sources

Aboriginal peoples of New South Wales
South Coast (New South Wales)